"Blow It Out" (also known as "Blow It Out Yo Ass") is the third single by Ludacris from the album Chicken-n-Beer. The diss song targets Bill O'Reilly because of the comments he made towards Ludacris.

50 Cent made a remix to the song which was never officially released. In 2006 a re-issue of this album was released internationally, mostly Europe, the Middle East and China, with the 50 Cent remix as a bonus.

Charts

References

2003 songs
2003 singles
Ludacris songs
Song recordings produced by Ron Browz
Songs written by Ludacris
Songs written by Ron Browz
Def Jam Recordings singles